1989–2003 is a compilation CD released by Hedningarna in 2003 under the NorthSide label. The album is a retrospect of Hedningarna's entire career, and is like other Hedningarna albums a mixture of electronics, rock and elements from old Scandinavian folk music. It covers the period from when Hedningarna was an acoustic trio and includes a rare remix of Kruspolka and two new tracks including the six members of Hedningarna that were part of the group in 2003.

Track listing

Hedningarna compilation albums
2003 compilation albums
Swedish-language compilation albums
NorthSide compilation albums